Alexander McNair (24 December 1882 – 18 November 1951) was a Scottish football player and manager. He played as a defender for Celtic for 21 years and represented the Scotland national team in 15 official internationals between 1906 and 1920. McNair also represented the Scottish League XI 15 times. He then managed Dundee from 1925 until 1927.

Stenhousemuir
McNair began his career at Stenhousemuir. He played at inside right and was a regular goalscorer, helping the club win the Scottish Qualifying Cup in 1901 and 1902. He also played in the Stenhousemuir team that reached the Scottish Cup semi-final in 1903, losing 4–1 to Rangers.

Celtic
In May 1904, McNair signed for Celtic. He initially played in a variety of positions, but when right-back Donnie McLeod left in 1908, McNair made that position his own. He was an integral part of the Celtic side spearheaded by Jimmy Quinn that won six successive league championships from 1904–05 to 1909–10. McNair had exceptional positional sense and ability to anticipate his opponents' moves. He was a precise tackler and had confidence in his ability to dribble the ball out of his own penalty area rather than rashly boot it forward. He was a calm and composed personality, and his demeanour earned him the nickname 'The Icicle'. Willie Maley, the Celtic manager, described McNair as "The coolest, most intelligent player I have ever seen."

In his 21 years at Celtic McNair played a total of 641 games for the club in major competitions, winning the league championship 12 times and the Scottish Cup six times. He played his last game on 18 April 1925, a 1–1 draw with Queen's Park. He was 41 years old and is the oldest player ever to play for Celtic. McNair's appearances, trophy and caps totals might have been even higher had it not been for the interruption of World War I when the League continued but the Cup and internationals were suspended, considering that his success at club level and selection for Scotland continued after the conflict.

He received a benefit match in 1921, in which a combined Rangers/Celtic team played against a Scottish League team (the league also selected Celtic players John McFarlane and Tully Craig, who scored all their team's goals in a 3–1 win).

Later years
McNair became manager of Dundee in June 1925. His first two seasons saw Dundee finish mid-table and then fifth. However, after a poor start to season 1927–28, he left Dens Park in October 1927. He then left full-time participation in football to become a stockbroker, but still kept some involvement in the game by working as a referee supervisor.

Honours

Player
Stenhousemuir
 Scottish Qualifying Cup: 1900–01, 1901–02

 Central Combination: 1900–01, 1901–02
 Stirlingshire Cup: 1901–02

Celtic
 Scottish League champions: 1904–05, 1905–06, 1906–07, 1907–08, 1908–09, 1909–10, 1913–14, 1914–15, 1915–16, 1916–17, 1918–19, 1921–22
 Scottish Cup: 1906–07, 1907–08, 1910–11, 1911–12, 1913–14, 1922–23
 Glasgow Cup: 1906–07, 1907–08, 1909–10, 1915–16, 1916–17, 1919–20, 1920–21
 Glasgow Charity Cup: 1904–05, 1911–12, 1912–13, 1913–14, 1914–15, 1915–16, 1916–17, 1917–18, 1919–20
 War Fund Shield: 1917–18

Scotland
 British Home Championship: 1905–06 (shared), 1907–08 (shared), 1909–10, 1911–12 (shared)

Manager
Dundee
 Forfarshire Cup: 1924–25, 1925–26

See also
 List of footballers in Scotland by number of league appearances (500+)
 List of Scotland national football team captains
 List of Scotland wartime international footballers

Notes and references

External links

TheCelticWiki profile
Alec McNair, Celtic's Icicle  David Potter

1882 births
Association football defenders
Scottish footballers
Footballers from Falkirk (council area)
People from Stenhousemuir
Scotland international footballers
Scotland wartime international footballers
Stenhousemuir F.C. players
Celtic F.C. players
Scottish football managers
Dundee F.C. managers
1951 deaths
Scottish Football League players
Scottish Football League representative players
Scottish Football League managers